Mercia MacDermott (born 7 April 1927) is an English writer and historian.  MacDermott is known for her books on Bulgarian history.

Early life
Mercia was born on 7 April 1927 in Plymouth, Devon, United Kingdom. Her father was Geoffrey Palmer Adshead, a Royal Navy surgeon captain, and her mother was Olive May Adshead, a teacher. Due to her father's work in the navy, she spent some of her early years in Weihai, China, where Mercia learned Mandarin Chinese. She grew up in Ditchling and later was educated at Westonbirt School, Gloucestershire and St Anne's College, Oxford University where she read Russian Literature. In the summer of 1947, while participating in a youth brigade in Yugoslavia with other English students, she first met with Bulgarians, among whom was the poet Pavel Matev.

In 1948, she graduated with an MA degree from Oxford and visited Bulgaria to participate in the international youth brigade building the Koprinka Reservoir. As a foreign udarnik, Mercia was invited along with other international participants to meet Georgi Dimitrov in the Euxinograd palace on the Bulgarian Black Sea Coast. While working at the Koprinka reservoir, Mercia met her future husband James MacDermott. Returning to the United Kingdom in 1948, MacDermott enrolled in a Bulgarian language course at the University of London's School of Slavonic and East European Studies.

Career
Mercia MacDermott visited and lived in Bulgaria from 1957 to 1989. From 1963 to 1964 and from 1973 to 1979 she was a teacher at the English Language High School in Sofia. MacDermott subsequently lectured on the Bulgarian national liberation movement in the region of Macedonia at Sofia University's Faculty of History. She was elected a foreign member of the Bulgarian Academy of Sciences in 1987. In 2007, Sofia University awarded her an Honorary Doctorate.

MacDermot's activity is described by Waller, Diane in

Positions and awards
From 1958 to 1973, Mercia MacDermott was the chairwoman of the London-based British–Bulgarian Friendship Society. An honorary citizen of Karlovo and Blagoevgrad, she is also the bearer of a number of Bulgarian state decorations.

Personal life
The MacDermotts divorced in 1964. Their  daughter Alexandra was born in 1952. She is a professor in physical chemistry at the University of Houston-Clear Lake in Texas. Mercia's brother Samuel Adrian Miles Adshead (1932–2009) was a distinguished sinologist and former professor of history at the University of Canterbury in New Zealand.

Bibliography
  
 The Apostle of Freedom (A portrait of Vasil Levsky against a background of nineteenth-century Bulgaria), Allen and Unwin, 1967, 
 Freedom or Death (the life of Gotsé Delchev), Journeyman Press, 1978, 
 For Freedom and Perfection (the life of Yané Sandansky), Journeyman Press, 1988, 
 Bulgarian Folk Customs, Jessica Kingsley Publishers, 1998, 
 Explore Green Men, Heart of Albion Press, 2006, 
 Lone red poppy, Manifesto Press, 2014, 
 Once upon a time in Bulgaria, Manifesto Press, 2016,

References

External links 
 
 
 
 

 
 

British historians
British expatriates in Bulgaria
People educated at Westonbirt School
1927 births
Living people
Foreign Members of the Bulgarian Academy of Sciences
Academic staff of Sofia University
British women non-fiction writers
British biographers
Alumni of St Anne's College, Oxford
Women biographers
People from Ditchling